They Walk in the Night is a collection of South African ghost stories or spiritual encounters by Eric Rosenthal published in 1949.

References

South African short story collections
1949 short story collections
Ghost stories